Qeshlaq-e Quinak (also Romanized as Qeshlāq-e Qū’īnak; also known as Qū’īnak) is a village in Behnampazuki-ye Jonubi Rural District, in the Central District of Varamin County, Tehran Province, Iran. At the 2006 census, its population was 2,653, in 631 families.

References 

Populated places in Varamin County